Fort Smith is the third-largest city in Arkansas and one of the two county seats of Sebastian County. As of the 2020 census, the population was 89,142. It is the principal city of the Fort Smith, Arkansas–Oklahoma Metropolitan Statistical Area, a region of 298,592 residents that encompasses the Arkansas counties of Crawford, Franklin, and Sebastian, and the Oklahoma counties of Le Flore and Sequoyah.

Fort Smith lies on the Arkansas–Oklahoma state border, situated at the confluence of the Arkansas and Poteau rivers, also known as Belle Point. Fort Smith was established as a western frontier military post in 1817, when it was also a center of fur trading. The city developed there. It became well known as a base for migrants' settling of the "Wild West" and for its law enforcement heritage.

The city government is led by Mayor George McGill (D), who made history in 2018 when he was elected as the city's first African American mayor, and a city Board of Directors composed of three members elected at-large and four members elected by ward.

History
Before the European colonization of the Americas, this region was inhabited by various indigenous American peoples, attracted by the proximity to two rivers. They used the waterways for transportation and trading, and to supply fish and water to their villages. The French claimed this area as part of their New France and La Louisiana. Some colonial fur traders traveled the Arkansas and other rivers to exchange goods with the tribes.

The United States acquired the territory and large areas west of the Mississippi River from France in the Louisiana Purchase (1803). Soon after, the government sent the Pike Expedition (1806) to explore the areas along the Arkansas River. The US founded Fort Smith in 1817 as a military post. It was named after General Thomas Adams Smith (1781–1844), who commanded the United States Army Rifle Regiment in 1817, headquartered near St. Louis. General Smith had ordered Army topographical engineer Stephen H. Long (1784–1864) to find a suitable site on the Arkansas River for a fort. General Smith never visited the town or the forts that bore his name.

A stockade was built and occupied from 1817 until 1822 by a small troop of regulars commanded by Major William Bradford. A small settlement began forming around the fort, but the Army abandoned the first Fort Smith in 1824 and moved 80 miles further west to Fort Gibson. John Rogers, an Army sutler and land speculator, bought up former government-owned lands at this site and promoted growth of the new civilian town of Fort Smith.

Due to the strategic location of this site, the federal government re-established a military presence at Fort Smith during the Indian Removal era of the 1830s, primarily of tribes from the American Southeast to west of the Mississippi River in Indian Territory, which is present-day Oklahoma.

In 1838 the Army moved back into the old military post near Belle Point, and expanded the base. They used troops to forcibly relocate the Choctaw and Cherokee, from their ancestral homelands in the Southeast; they were the last of the tribes to leave. Remnants of the Five ‘Civilized’ Tribes remained in the southeast, and some of their descendants have reorganized and been federally recognized. The Cherokee called the forced migration the Trail of Tears, as some of their people and the people who were enslaved died from starvation, hypothermia, exhaustion and many illnesses along the way. The army enforced the removal of these tribes to the reserved Indian Territory, where the federal government set aside land that was less fertile while imposing detentes between distinct nations. Many displaced people stopped walking and settled in Fort Smith and adjoining Van Buren, Arkansas on the other side of the river.

The US Army also used Fort Smith as a base during the Mexican War (1846-1848). As a result, the US acquired large territories in the Southwest, and later annexed the Republic of Texas, which had been independent from 1836-1846.

Sebastian County was formed in 1851, separated from Crawford County north of the Arkansas River. In 1858, Fort Smith was designated as a Division Center of the Butterfield Overland Mail's 7th Division route across Indian Territory from Fort Smith to Texas and as a junction with the mail route from Memphis, Tennessee, an important port on the east side of the Mississippi River.

For roughly a year of the U.S. Civil War, the fort was occupied by the Confederate Army. Union troops under General Steele took control of Fort Smith on September 1, 1863. A small fight occurred there on July 31, 1864, but the Union army maintained command in the area until the war ended in 1865. As a result, many refugee slaves, orphans, Southern Unionists, and others came here to escape the guerrilla warfare raging in Arkansas, Missouri, and the Border States. The slaves were freed under the Emancipation Proclamation of January 1863 by President Abraham Lincoln. Federal troops abandoned the post of Fort Smith for the last time in 1871. The town continued to thrive despite the absence of federal troops.

Two of Fort Smith's most notable historic figures were Judge Isaac Parker and William Henry Harrison Clayton, also known as W.H.H. Clayton. In 1874, William Henry Harrison Clayton was appointed United States Attorney for the Western District of Arkansas by President Ulysses S. Grant. Fort Smith was a bustling community full of brothels, saloons and outlaws, just across the river from Indian Territory. William Clayton realized a strong judge would be necessary to bring law and order to the region. He knew that Isaac Parker was a strong judge. But Judge Parker had been appointed Chief Justice of Utah Territory and confirmed by the US Senate. With the help of President Grant and US Senator Powell Clayton, former governor of Arkansas, William Clayton was able to gain the appointment of Judge Parker in the Fort Smith district.

Judge Isaac Parker served as U.S. District Judge 1875–1896. He was nicknamed the "Hanging Judge": in his first term after assuming his post, he tried 18 people for murder, convicted 15 of them, and sentenced eight of those to die. Six of these men were later hanged on the same day. Over the course of his career in Fort Smith, Parker sentenced 160 people to death. Of those, 79 were executed on the gallows. His courthouse is now marked as a National Historic Site, where "more men were put to death by the U.S. Government... than in any other place in American history."

William Clayton served as US Attorney under four different presidents and later was appointed as Chief Justice of Indian Territory. He was instrumental in achieving statehood for Oklahoma in 1907, after Native American claims were extinguished by distribution of communal lands under the Dawes Act and the breakup of tribal governments. Together with Territorial Governor Frank Frantz, Clayton took a copy of the Oklahoma Constitution to President Theodore Roosevelt after the state was admitted to the Union in 1907. Governor Frantz and Judge Clayton both lost their territorial positions when Oklahoma became a state; a new governor was elected and the Roosevelt administration appointed a new judge.

During investment in the military prior to World War II, the Army returned to Fort Smith in 1941. It established the Fort Chaffee Military Reservation east of the city.

On April 21, 1996, a large tornado, part of the April 1996 tornado outbreak sequence, destroyed and heavily damaged much of historic downtown Fort Smith around the Garrison Avenue Bridge. The storm tracked from eastern Pittsburg County, Oklahoma into Fort Smith and Van Buren, Arkansas. The tornado left four people dead in western Arkansas. Days later, the damaged Eads Brothers Furniture building in downtown Fort Smith was destroyed by one of the largest fires in the city's history.

Geography
Fort Smith is located at  (35.368691, −94.398737).

Climate
Fort Smith has a humid subtropical climate with generally mild winters and hot, humid summers. The average first and last occurrences for freezing temperatures are November 6 and March 25, respectively. Fort Smith is situated near an area known as Tornado Alley in the central United States. The city has been struck by three major tornadoes, which occurred in the years of 1898, 1927 and 1996.

Demographics

2020 census

As of the 2020 United States census, there were 89,142 people, 36,210 households, and 22,349 families residing in the city.

2010 census
As of the census of 2010, there were 86,209 people, 34,352 households, and 21,367 families residing in the city. The racial makeup of the city was 69.3% White, 9.0% Black or African American, 1.8% Native American, 5.3% Asian (2.2% Vietnamese, 1.7% Laotian, 0.3% Asian Indian, 0.2% Filipino, 0.1% Korean, 0.1% Chinese, 0.1% Hmong, 0.1% Pakistani), 0.1% Pacific Islander, 10.3% from other races, and 4.2% from two or more races. 16.5% of the population were Hispanic or Latino of any race (11.6% Mexican, 2.2% Salvadoran, 0.4% Guatemalan, 0.3% Puerto Rican, 0.2% Honduran, 0.1% Cuban, 0.1% Peruvian, 0.1% Colombian).

In language, Fort Smith has more than ten Asian languages spoken by more than two percent of the population. Also, the increase in immigration from Latin American countries in the late 20th century increased the number of residents who speak Spanish. 7.10% reported speaking Spanish at home, while 3.38% speak Vietnamese and Lao, and 2.50% speak Tagalog.

In 2000 there were 32,398 households, of which 30.8% had children under the age of 18 living with them, 47.1% were married couples living together, 12.3% had a female householder with no husband present, and 36.3% were non-families. 30.7% of all households were made up of individuals, and 10.9% had someone living alone who was 65 years of age or older. The average household size was 2.42 and the average family size was 3.03.

In the city, the population was spread out, with 25.4% under the age of 18, 9.8% from 18 to 24, 29.3% from 25 to 44, 21.8% from 45 to 64, and 13.7% who were 65 years of age or older. The median age was 35 years. For every 100 females, there were 94.1 males. For every 100 females age 18 and over, there were 91.0 males.

The median income for a household in the city was $32,157, and the median income for a family was $41,012. Males had a median income of $29,799 versus $22,276 for females. The per capita income for the city was $18,994. About 12.1% of families and 15.8% of the population were below the poverty line, including 22.2% of those under age 18 and 9.6% of those age 65 or over.

Economy
Fort Smith has long been a regional manufacturing center, with major plants located in the city operated by Rheem, Trane, Georgia-Pacific, Gerber, Kraft Heinz Company-Planters Peanuts, Mars Petcare, Umarex USA, Graphic Packaging, International Paper, Pernod Ricard-USA, and many others.

Fort Smith is home to several corporations, including ABB Motors & Mechanical, ArcBest and poultry company OK Foods.

According to the city's 2011 Comprehensive Annual Financial Report, the top employers in the city are:

Culture
Various television programs and movies have been filmed in Fort Smith, including The Blue and The Gray (1982), A Soldier's Story (1984), Biloxi Blues (1988) Trespass (1992 film) and Tuskegee Airmen (1995)

Museums

There are multiple museums in Fort Smith, located primarily in the downtown area and the Chaffee Crossing Historic District

Fort Smith Regional Art Museum opened to the public on January 19, 2013.
Fort Smith Museum of History, located almost adjacent to the National Historic Site. The museum contains numerous exhibits, displays and artifacts that tell the story of Fort Smith's history—from the first fort in 1817, through the westward expansion, and on to the Civil War, the Gay Nineties, Fort Chaffee, and the emergence of a modern city.
Fort Smith Trolley Museum is a railroad museum which displays a number of antique trolleys and related items. One of the trolley cars and three of the locomotives in its collection are listed on the National Register of Historic Places.
 Fort Smith Air Museum is dedicated to preserving the history of the development of aviation in Western Arkansas and Eastern Oklahoma.
 The Clayton House Museum is the original home of William H.H. Clayton. It is open for tours and rentals for weddings, meetings, events, and much more. The house holds many Clayton artifacts, and boldly tells the history of Mr. Clayton as well as the western frontier
 Chaffee Barbershop Museum - located in the Chaffee Crossing Historic District in east Fort Smith, this museum was the location where, on March 25, 1958, Elvis Presley received his iconic G.I buzz cut
 In 2007, the city of Fort Smith was selected as the site of the new United States Marshals Service National Museum, scheduled to open in 2023.

Music
Fort Smith has an active music scene. There are frequent live performances in the downtown area by local and national Jazz, Blues, Country, Americana and Rock bands.
Local bands regularly frequent the riverfront area highlighting the river valley's finest.
Fort Smith Symphony - the symphony is a per-service professional orchestra composed of musicians from Fort Smith, Fayetteville, Springfield, Tulsa, Oklahoma City, Norman, Dallas, Little Rock, New York, Florida and other communities. The Fort Smith Symphony, conducted by John Jeter, regularly performs at the Arkansas Best Performing Arts Center.

Attractions
As the second largest city in western Arkansas, Fort Smith offers many activities and attractions. Fort Smith's theater and event venues regularly host major concerts and touring theater companies.

Event venues
Riverfront Amphitheater - Located next to the Arkansas River, the Riverfront Amphitheater represents one-third of the River Park Complex.
Fort Smith Convention Center, with 140,000 square feet of space, is one of the largest convention centers in the region, second only to Little Rock's Statehouse Convention Center, with 225,000 square feet. Many trade shows, conventions, and other events are held here each year. The performing arts theater is home to the Fort Smith Symphony and has seating for 1,331 people.
The Blue Lion - This Performing and Visual Arts Center has an intimate 250-seat theater and  Art Gallery.

Shopping
Fort Smith is the main shopping destination of Western Arkansas and Eastern Oklahoma. Central Mall is the state's largest indoor shopping center in terms of area.

Some notable shopping locations in the city of Fort Smith are:
Rogers Avenue
Central Mall
GreenPointe Shopping Center
Massard Crossing
Stonewood Village
Williamsburg Square
Phoenix Avenue/Greenwood Ave.
Fort Smith Pavilion
May Branch Square
Phoenix Center

Landmarks

 Fort Smith National Historic Site, the most prominent landmark, which includes the remains of the original 1817 fort on the Arkansas River. Inside is the restored courtroom of the famed "Hangin' Judge" Isaac C. Parker, and the dingy frontier jail aptly named "Hell on the Border." Eventually, this would become the unofficial nickname for all of Fort Smith.
 Belle Grove Historic District, a 22-block area in downtown Fort Smith comprises nearly 25 restored homes that span 130 years of varying architectural styles.
 Clayton House Museum, formerly the home of W. H. H. Clayton, United States Attorney for the United States District Court for the Western District of Arkansas and chief prosecutor in the court of "hanging judge" Isaac Parker, was built for Clayton in 1882 and owned by him until 1912. The house was listed on the National Register of Historic Places in 1970. 
 Miss Laura's Social Club, a former brothel and the only remaining building from the Row, is home to the city's Convention and Visitors Bureau and the only former house of prostitution on the National Register of Historic Places.
 Fort Chaffee, primarily used as a training facility by regional National Guard and Reserve Corps units as well as active military units from other installations. In 1958, the entertainer Elvis Presley stopped off at Fort Chaffee en route to his basic training in Texas. It was here that the public information officer John J. Mawn told a news conference that Presley would receive the standard "G.I. haircut" and would resemble a "peeled onion".

Annual attractions
Peacemaker Music Fest -  held each summer since 2015 at the Riverfront Amphitheater, performers have included Jason Isbell, Grace Potter, Lucero, The Revivalists, Anderson East, Samantha Fish and Ryan Bingham
Unexpected - Urban Contemporary Art Festival - held each fall since 2015, artists have included D*Face, Okuda San Miguel, Maser, Alexis Diaz, Add Fuel and Ana Maria
Fort Smith Riverfront Blues Fest - held since 1991 along the Arkansas River in downtown Fort Smith
Steel Horse Rally - a motorcycle rally held each spring since 2015 to raise money for local charities
Arkansas-Oklahoma State Fair - this bi-state fair occurs over a ten-day period in late September
Old Fort Days Rodeo - Fort Smith's annual Old Fort Days Rodeo and Barrel-Racing Futurity offers nearly ten days of Wild West activities. It has been held every May since the mid-1930s
Fort Smith Brewing Anniversary - Held the last Saturday of September every year since 2017, this festival showcases Fort Smith's only Brewery and is a celebration of the new economic zone known as the Chaffee Crossing Historic District.
 Hanging Judge Border Feud High School Rodeo is held every March or April, schedule permitting. This event is held at Kay Rodgers Park, and includes rodeo events as well as a spring livestock show. The events are open to any high school students
Fort Smith Juneteenth Community Festival - Juneteenth is the oldest nationally celebrated commemoration of the ending of slavery in the United States

Sports and recreation
In addition to sports teams sponsored by Fort Smith Public Schools and University of Arkansas-Fort Smith, Fort Smith has several independent recreational sports programs and annual tournaments administered by local organizations:

Fort Smith Marathon 
Battle at the Fort Volleyball Tournament - held each January at the Fort Smith Convention Center
 United Way Charity Golf Classic - May 2020 at Hardscrabble Country Club
 Fort Smith Tournament of Champions - high school basketball tournament
 Fort Smith Church League Baseball
 Ben Geren Softball Association
 River Valley Futbol Club
 River Valley Cycling Club
 Western Arkansas Pickleball Association

Education

Higher education

The city has one major university that is part of the University of Arkansas System. The University of Arkansas at Fort Smith was founded in 1928 as an extension of the Fort Smith Public School system, with the superintendent, James William Ramsey, acting as the college president and the high school principal as dean. Known originally as Fort Smith Junior College, the institution operated within the Fort Smith public school system until 1950, when the school was incorporated as a private, nonprofit institution with its own governing board. In September 1952, the college moved from borrowed facilities in the high school to its current site, initially occupying .

In 1966, the institution's name was changed from Fort Smith Junior College to Westark Junior College and in 1972, it was renamed Westark Community College, indicating the larger area to be served and reflecting the more comprehensive mission.

The name of the college was changed yet again in February 1998 to Westark College, more accurately portraying the role and scope of the institution.

On December 15, 2000, the Board of Trustees of Westark College entered into an agreement with the Board of Trustees of the University of Arkansas to merge with the University of Arkansas System as a four-year institution. In 2001, the Sebastian County electorate voted to support the merger. A formal request to change affiliation status to that of a bachelor's degree-granting institution under the name of the University of Arkansas at Fort Smith was submitted to the Higher Learning Commission in August 2001 and approved by the Institutional Actions Council on November 19, 2001.

The merger, which became official on January 1, 2002, endorsed the concept of UA-Fort Smith as a unique university, one that offers applied and traditional baccalaureate degree programs, one- and two-year associate and technical programs, and noncredit business and industry training programs. While the University of Arkansas at Fort Smith is the city's only state supported institution of higher learning.

In addition to the University of Arkansas-Fort Smith (UAFS), the Arkansas College of Osteopathic Medicine (ARCOM), a private, non-profit institution, welcomed its inaugural class in August 2017. Graduates of ARCOM receive a Doctor of Osteopathic Medicine (DO) degree.

Elementary and secondary education
The public schools in the majority of Fort Smith, as well as a section of Barling, are operated by the Fort Smith School District. Currently, the district includes 26 schools. During the 2019–2020 school year, the district had an enrollment of more than 14,748 students. It has 2 high schools, 4 middle schools, 19 elementary schools, and 1 alternative learning center.

Fort Smith public schools provide education from kindergarten through the 12th grade, as do some private Protestant schools. Catholic parochial schools offer education through the ninth grade.

Middle Schools in Fort Smith include Chaffin Middle School, Ramsey Middle School, Kimmons Middle School, and Darby Middle School.
Private schools covering the same grade range include Trinity Catholic School, Union Christian Academy, and Northside Christian Academy.

High schools in Fort Smith include the public Northside High School and Southside High School, along with the private Union Christian Academy and Northside Christian Academy.

Some portions of Fort Smith in the south are zoned to Greenwood School District.

Fort Smith previously had a Catholic grade school for black children, St. John the Baptist School; it closed in 1968.

Media

Print
The Southwest Times Record is the largest newspaper in the city, as well as the region. It is owned by Gannett. The Hispanos Unidos is the only Spanish-language publication in the region. Other publications in the Fort Smith area include Entertainment Fort Smith and Do South Magazine.

Radio
AM radio Stations in the Fort Smith area include:

FM Radio Stations in the Fort Smith area include:

Television
Television stations in the Fort Smith area include:

Infrastructure

Transportation
Fort Smith is a major transportation hub for the surrounding region. It sits at the crossroads of two major interstate highways, is surrounded on three sides by the Arkansas River, is served by 1 major and 2 regional/switching railroad companies, and is the home of a regional airport.

The city sits just southwest of the intersection of Interstate 40 and Interstate 49. Interstate 49 will extend southward to meet Interstate 30 in Texarkana, Texas. US 71 and US 64 also run through the community.

Fort Smith is served by the Fort Smith Regional Airport (FSM), which is used for military aviation for Fort Chaffee and home of the 188th Fighter Wing of the Arkansas Air National Guard, but is also served by two commercial airlines with flights to Dallas/Fort Worth and Atlanta.

Jefferson Lines bus service also links Fort Smith to other communities such as Little Rock, Kansas City, and Oklahoma City, as well as intermediate points, with numerous connections to other cities and towns.

The city is located on the Arkansas River, part of the McClellan-Kerr Navigation System and is served by the Port of Fort Smith.

Fort Smith is served by the Kansas City Southern Railway from a branch connection on the mainline at Poteau, Oklahoma, and affords connections to other railroads at Kansas City, Missouri, and at New Orleans, Louisiana. In addition, the regional railroad company, the Arkansas and Missouri Railroad directly serves Fort Smith and provides connections through the St. Louis, Missouri, and Memphis gateways to the east. The Fort Smith Railroad provides local switching service to a variety of businesses as well as providing haulage for the Union Pacific Railway with which it connects at Van Buren, Arkansas. At this time, there is no direct passenger service from Amtrak. The closest point for such service is Little Rock.

Within the city, public bus service is provided by Fort Smith Transit (FST). As of January 2015, FST operates 6 fixed routes, as well as paratransit service for disabled persons and Demand Buses.

A trolley-replica bus operates in the downtown area, providing transportation between the Belle Grove Historic District and the Fort Smith National Historic Site. The Fort Smith Trolley Museum operates genuine trolleys, but as a historic attraction, rather than as transportation.

Utilities

Fort Smith uses two water treatment plants (WTPs) for its drinking water; one near Lake Fort Smith in Mountainburg and one on Lee Creek. The city announced August 12, 2021 that the Massard Water Reclamation Facility would need to undergo a $22 million upgrade to avoid failure. If failure occurs, nearly all of East Fort Smith and surrounding towns would be without wastewater treatment, causing wastewater to flow into the Arkansas River. It has had little to no upgrades since built in 1966.

Health care

Hospitals in Fort Smith include:

Mercy Hospital Fort Smith
Baptist Health-Fort Smith (Formerly Sparks Regional Medical Center)
HealthSouth Rehabilitation Hospital
Valley Behavioral Health System
Mercy Orthopedic Hospital
Select Specialty Hospital

Accolades
Fort Smith is named by Forbes as having the lowest cost of living in the United States.
Fort Smith was where the first Southern woman, Dymple Johnson, was allowed to vote, November 13, 1917.
Fort Smith is also ranked sixth on its list of "Cities in America for Cost of Doing Business".
The bathrooms at Fort Smith Regional Airport were voted as the best public restrooms in the United States in 2005.

Notable people

Notable figures who were born in, lived in, or are otherwise associated with Fort Smith.

Athletes
 Isaiah Joe, former University of Arkansas Shooting Guard, drafted by the Philadelphia 76ers, now plays for the Oklahoma City Thunder.
 Jaylin Williams, former University of Arkansas center, drafted by the Oklahoma City Thunder.
 Martine Bercher, former University of Arkansas All-American defensive back.
 Ron Brewer, former University of Arkansas shooting guard, drafted by the Portland Trailblazers. 
 Kodi Burns, former Auburn University quarterback, now wide receivers coach at the University of Tennessee. 
 Ravin Caldwell, former National Football League player.
 Glen Condren, former National Football League player, New York Giants and Atlanta Falcons; born in Fort Smith, 1942.
 Harry Feldman, former Major League Baseball player.
 Jim Files, former National Football League player.
 Jack Fleck, professional golfer, 1955 US Open winner.
 Ryan Franklin, pitcher for St. Louis Cardinals and Olympic gold medalist.
 Craig Gentry, Major League Baseball player.
 Brett Goode, Former National Football League player. Super Bowl Champion long snapper with the Green Bay Packers.
 Neale Henderson, Negro league baseball player.
 Priest Holmes, former National Football League player.
 Jim King, former National Basketball Association player and NBA All-Star.
 Dat Nguyen, former linebacker for the Dallas Cowboys.
 Jahlil Okafor, Professional basketball player, Philadelphia 76ers and Brooklyn Nets; born in Fort Smith, lived in nearby Moffett, Oklahoma until the age of 9.
 Scotty Robertson, coached at C.E. Byrd High School in Shreveport, Louisiana, Louisiana Tech University in Ruston, and for four NBA teams; born in Fort Smith in 1930.

Actors, musicians, and media
 Katharine Alexander (1898–1981), actress.
 James Cotten, film director, actor, writer, producer.
 Juliette Danielle, actress.
 Charlie Jones (1930-2008), sportscaster.
 Douglas C. Jones (1924-1998), author of historical fiction.
 Brandon Keener, actor.
 Jerry Keller, singer. 
 Laurence Luckinbill, actor.
 Rudy Ray Moore (1927-2008), singer and actor.
 Rossi Morreale, reality show star, actor, and television host.
 Brad Neely, modern web artist.
 Marty Stouffer, creator of Wild America TV series.
 Alphonso Trent (1902-1959), jazz bandleader and musician.
 Hunter Doohan, actor.

Politicians, lawyers, and judges
 John Boozman (born 1950), United States Senator and former United States Representative for Arkansas's 3rd congressional district; Northside High School graduate and football player for the Arkansas Razorbacks; brother of Fay Boozman.
 Virgil Bozeman (1912–2007), Illinois state representative and lawyer
 Charles Winchester Breedlove, Los Angeles City Council member, 1933–45, born in Fort Smith.
 Clifton R. Breckinridge (1846–1932), a Democratic alderman, congressman, diplomat, businessman and veteran of the Confederate States of America Army and Navy.
 William Lee Cazort (1887–1969), former Lieutenant Governor of Arkansas, graduated from high school in Fort Smith.
 W. H. H. Clayton (1840–1920), soldier, attorney, judge, justice of the Central District Court in Indian Territory; lived in Fort Smith 1873–1893, while serving under Judge Isaac Parker, before moving to McAlester, Oklahoma; buried in Fort Smith National Cemetery.
 Mark Darr (born 1973), former Lieutenant Governor of Arkansas, was born in Fort Smith.
 Jake Files (born 1972), state senator from Fort Smith since 2011; former member of the Arkansas House of Representatives. 
 William Meade Fishback (1831–1903) was a Democratic Governor of Arkansas and selected to be a member of the United States Senate but was not allowed to serve.
 Charlene Fite (born 1950), educator in Fort Smith and Republican state representative from Crawford and Washington counties.
 B. G. Hendrix (1922–2020), former state representative for Fort Smith.
 Asa Hutchinson (born 1950), Republican Governor of Arkansas starting in 2015, Republican former U.S. representative, Drug Enforcement Administration head, Under Secretary of Homeland Security, U.S. Senate nominee in 1986, and Arkansas gubernatorial nominee in 2006.
 Carol Kelso (born 1945), former member of the Wisconsin State Assembly and Executive of Brown County, Wisconsin.
 Marilyn Lloyd (1929–2018), Democratic Congresswoman from Tennessee's 3rd congressional district, 1975–1995; was born in Fort Smith
 George E. Nowotny (born 1932), Republican member of the Arkansas House of Representatives for Sebastian County from 1967 to 1972; resident of Tulsa, Oklahoma.
 Carolyn Pollan (born 1937), former member of Arkansas House of Representatives, longest-serving Republican and longest-serving woman member of the chamber.
 Isaac C. Parker (1838–1896), the "Hanging Judge".
 William L. Spicer (1918–1991), chairman of the Arkansas Republican Party from 1962 to 1964, who quarreled with Winthrop Rockefeller; owner of a chain of drive-in theaters.

Other
 Benjamin Bonneville (1796–1878), explorer of the American West.
 John R. Clarke, author and Scientific Director at the United States Navy Experimental Diving Unit 
 Charles M. Cooke, Jr., World War II admiral, naval strategist, Commander of the USS Pennsylvania during the attack at Pearl Harbor.
 Max C. Currick (1877–1947), rabbi
 William O. Darby (1911–1945), heroic World War II general.
 Alyse Eady (born 1988), Miss Arkansas, 2011 Miss America first runner-up.
 Jeff Gillan (born 1957), journalist
 Ozro Thurston "O.T." Jones, Sr. (1891-1972), second Senior Bishop of the Church of God in Christ
 Mame Stewart Josenberger (c1870-1964), businesswoman and club leader in Fort Smith
 Bass Reeves (1838–1910), thought to be one of the first African Americans to have received a commission as a U.S. Deputy Marshal west of the Mississippi River.
 Roger Lee Steele (1945–2012), graphic artist/printmaker
 Cap Tilles (1865–1951), capitalist and philanthropist.
 Frederick Hinde Zimmerman (1864-1924), businessman, and founder of the Grand Rapids Hotel.

Sister cities
Fort Smith has a sister city relationship with Cisterna di Latina, Italy, site of the World War II Battle of Cisterna, fought by United States Army Rangers commanded by Fort Smith native William Orlando Darby. The city also has a mutual friendship-city relationship with Jining, China.

  Cisterna di Latina, Italy – 1983
  Jining, Shandong, China

See also
 
 List of cities and towns in Arkansas

References

External links

 City of Fort Smith
 Fort Smith Convention and Visitors Bureau
 

 
Cities in Arkansas
Cities in Sebastian County, Arkansas
Arkansas populated places on the Arkansas River
County seats in Arkansas
Fort Smith metropolitan area
Populated places established in 1817
1817 establishments in Missouri Territory